Klára Anna Verseghy (2 February 1930 – 3 November 2020) was a Hungarian lichenologist. She was the curator of the lichen collection of the Hungarian Natural History Museum in Budapest from 1958 to 1985.

Biography

Klára Verseghy was born in Budapest on 2 February 1930 to parents Károly Verseghy (an officer) and Gabriella Uhlai. All of her education was undertaken in Budapest, including elementary, secondary grammar school, and university. She graduated from Eötvös Loránd University in 1953 as a teacher of biology and chemistry. Soon after she started employment at the Hungarian Natural History Museum. After starting as a librarian, in 1958 she became curator of the lichen collections, assuming a position previously held by prominent Hungarian lichenologist Ödön Szatala. She held this position for 32 years, until her retirement in 1985.

In 1958, she defended her thesis  ("Monograph of the European Ochrolechia species") under her supervisor Szatala.

As part of her work in the lichen herbarium, Verseghy curated the extensive collections of Ferenc Fóriss, Vilmos Kőfaragó-Gyelnik and Szatala in the classification system proposed by Alexander Zahlbruckner. She separated the type specimens, and in 1964 used this collection to compile the type catalogue of the lichen collection, which ended up numbering more than 1000 specimens. Verseghy collected about 5,000 lichen specimens in several areas of Hungary, including Bakony, Hortobágy, Kiskunság, Villány Mountains, Zemplén Mountains. An additional 1,500 specimens were from abroad–Finland, Norway, Poland, Romania, Slovakia, Sweden, Turkey and Ukraine were collecting destinations. She published more than a hundred scientific and popular papers mainly on floristics, taxonomy, plant physiology, and bioindication. Verseghy introduced 46 new taxa (19 species, 27 varieties and forms) and 69 new combinations. She published taxonomic revisions of species from the genera Caloplaca, Gasparrinia, Ochrolechia, Squamaria, and Squamarina. Together with Edit Láng she initiated ecophysiological research on Hungarian lichens.

She prepared her main work, Magyarország zuzmó órájának kézikönyve ("The handbook of the Hungarian lichen flora") in 1994, during her retirement; this work contained descriptions of 715 lichens found in Hungary.

Selected publications
Verseghy had 106 publications, including 23 that were about popular subjects; a complete listing in given in Farkas and colleagues' 2021 obituary. Some representative works are listed:

Eponyms
The lichen genus Verseghya  and the species Verseghya klarae , Nectriopsis verseghy-klarae , and Opegrapha verseghyklarae  are named after her.

See also
 List of Hungarian botanists

References

1930 births
2020 deaths
Hungarian lichenologists
Eötvös Loránd University alumni
Scientists from Budapest
Hungarian women curators